Juojärvi is a lake in Finland. It is considered one of the cleanest lakes of the country. The New Valamo monastery is located on the shore of Juojärvi.

References

LJuojarvi
Lakes of Heinävesi
Lakes of Liperi
Lakes of Outokumpu